The Martinez Refinery, also known as the Golden Eagle refinery, is located in the San Francisco Bay Area in an unincorporated area known as Avon, east of Martinez, California. It refines oil into gasoline and other petroleum based products. Previously owned by Tidewater, Tosco, Valero, Tesoro and Marathon Petroleum, 
The refinery is located on 850 acres, in 2016 had approximately 650 full-time employees, and has a crude oil capacity of 157,000 barrels per day. In 2015 it was the fourth-largest refinery in the state. The refinery has a Nelson Complexity Index of 16.1.

History
Established in 1878–1879, Avon was railroad station named for Shakespeare's Avon. It was originally called Marsh, and in 1913 the name was changed to Associated.  The name Marsh was in honor of John Marsh. The name Associated was for the Tidewater Associated Oil Company, owner of the site.

The refinery was first built in 1913 under the name Avon Refinery, and has been continually expanded since. It was purchased by Tosco in 1976. By the 1990s, a history of poor maintenance and under-staffing gave the refinery a reputation for being a hazardous workplace. Throughout the 1990s, it led the US refining industry in the number of environmental and safety code violations. These poor conditions culminated in two catastrophic accidents. In the first, a 1997 hydrocracker explosion killed one worker. In the second of these, four workers died and a fifth was hospitalized in a 1999 naphtha explosion. A maintenance supervisor refused to shut down the unit after corroding valves failed to stop the flow of the extremely hazardous substance.

In May 2002, the refinery was purchased by Tesoro Petroleum from Valero Energy, along with 70 Ultramar and Beacon gas stations in Northern California, for the total of $1,075 billion.

In November 2010, the refinery had a flaring event, due to a simultaneous PG&E utility power and Foster Wheeler co-generation plant failure, that produced large quantities of thick black smoke.

In February 2015, a nationwide strike by USW represented employees resulted in the closure of the Martinez refinery, the only refinery closure resulting from the strike.

On December 15, 2015, thick smoke and flames could be seen rising up from the refinery. Due to the loss of a primary steam generation unit, flaring was done to release pressure. A level-2 alert was issued to the community, recommending that they stay indoors due to smoke blowing offsite. The alert was reduced to Level 0 on the same day.

References

External links
 

Oil refineries in the United States
Oil refineries in California
Martinez, California
Buildings and structures in Contra Costa County, California
Energy infrastructure in California
Petroleum in California
Energy in the San Francisco Bay Area
1913 establishments in California
Energy infrastructure completed in 1913